Jimmy "Brixton Towers" Joubert (21 October 1952) was a South African footballer who played in the FPL, NPSL and NSL as a defender and then a striker later in his career.

Swaraj
Joubert was signed from Southern Suburbs in the 1970s. He helped Swaraj United win the FPL in 1977 winning the Golden Boot with 23 goals.

Highlands Park
At Dion Highlands Park Joubert and his team won the NPSL in 1980 only, beating Kaizer Chiefs by five points.

Kaizer Chiefs
In 1981, he joined the Chiefs under experienced coach Joe Frickleton, and they won the quadruple.

Personal life
His son, Mark Joubert played for Hellenic.

References

1952 births
Kaizer Chiefs F.C. players
South African soccer players
Living people
South African people of French descent
Association football forwards
Association football defenders
Southern Suburbs F.C. players